Main Chup Rahungi (English: I Shall Remain Silent) is a 1962 Indian Hindi-language film directed by A. Bhimsingh and produced by A.V. Meiyappan. The film stars Meena Kumari and Sunil Dutt in lead roles. The film was a remake of 1960 Tamil film Kalathur Kannamma.

Plot
Narayan (Nana Palsikar) works as a laborer on a farmland owned by businessman Ratan Kumar, in Ramnagar. Although Narayan was an ex-convict, Ratan had assisted him getting a job, some land, and a small house where he now lives with his grown daughter, Gayetri (Meena Kumari), who is training to be a teacher. To his complete shock, Narayan finds out that Gayetri is pregnant. Ratan asks Narayan to take some money and relocate, which Narayan gratefully does. Gayetri gives birth to a baby boy, and Narayan takes him to an orphanage donated by Ratan himself, and informs Gayetri that her child was still-born. Gayetri and Narayan eventually return to Ramnagar, and as luck would have it, Gayetri finds a job as a teacher in the orphanage that her son (now named Shyam) lives in. When Ratan's son, Kamal (Sunil Dutt), returns from Singapore, he meets Shyam and likes him, but when he finds out that his school-teacher is Gayetri, he demands that Gayetri be fired as she is not of good character. Who is Shyam's father, why Gayetri remains silent about her child's identity, and what Kamal knows about Gayetri's background are the questions to be discovered later in the film.

Cast
Meena Kumari as Gayatri
Sunil Dutt as Kamal Kumar
Nana Palsikar as Narayan
Babloo as Shyam
Jagirdar as Ratan Kumar
Mohan Choti as Madhav
Helen as Menka
Raj Mehra as Thekedaar

Awards

 37th Filmfare Awards:

Nominated

 Best Actress – Meena Kumari
 Best Story – Jawar N. Sitaraman

Music

The soundtrack of the film contains 7 songs. The music is composed by Chitragupta, with lyrics authored by Rajendra Krishan.

References

External links

1962 films
1960s Hindi-language films
Films scored by Chitragupta
Hindi remakes of Tamil films
Films directed by A. Bhimsingh